Sreenidi Deccan Football Club is an Indian professional football club based in Hyderabad, Telangana. Established on 1 January 2015 as a football academy at Hyderabad and launched from Visakhapatnam, Andhra Pradesh in 2021, the club currently competes in the I-League. On 5 June 2020, All India Football Federation (AIFF) issued an invitation to accept bids for new clubs to join the I-League and on 12 August, Sreenidi Deccan FC was granted playing rights directly in 2021–22 I-League.

History

Formation and journey
Sreenidi football academy was founded in January 2015 in Aziznagar. It received the first accreditation from the AIFF in June 2019 and in its initial years the club played in the football leagues for the age groups of U13, U15 & U18.

On 5 June 2020, the AIFF issued an invitation to accept bids for new clubs to join the league, and on 12 August Sreenidi Deccan were granted playing rights directly in 2021–22 I-League. Sreenidi Deccan Football Club was formally launched on 7 July 2021 in Visakhapatnam by state sports minister Muttamsetti Srinivasa Rao. In 2021, they participated in the IFA Shield and reached the final, losing to Real Kashmir FC by 2–1 and finished as runners-up.

The club began its league campaign on 27 December against NEROCA with a 3–2 defeat. In the next game, they defeated TRAU by 3–1 with a brace from Colombian striker David Castañeda, and later lost 3–1 to Mohammedan Sporting. After finishing fourth in group stage with six wins in twelve matches, they moved to the championship stage. At the end, the club finished their maiden league campaign in third place with 32 points in 18 matches, and won the last match against Churchill Brothers on 14 May. Later in November, the club participated in Baji Rout Cup in Odisha and reached semi-finals.

In August 2022, Portuguese manager Carlos Vaz Pinto was appointed head coach. The club retained their key players including Colombian striker David Castañeda Muñoz. In 2022–23 I-League season, Sreenidi Deccan achieved second position.

Stadium
Sreenidi Deccan use Deccan Arena as their home ground, which is located in Sreenidi Football Villa, Aziznagar, Hyderabad, and was inaugurated in November 2022.

The club when entered into I-League, proposed to use the DYSSR Stadium un Visakhapatnam for home matches, a multi-purpose stadium having capacity of 27,500. Due to COVID-19 pandemic in India, all league games were played in few centralized venues in West Bengal, and the club never used DYSSR Stadium.

Crest, colours & kits
The primary club colours are orange and green. The primary colours, along with the secondary white colour can be seen on the crest as well as the jerseys. Club's kits were launched by the Visakhapatnam Port Trust chairman K Ramamohana Rao.

Kit manufacturers and shirt sponsors

Players

First-team squad

Personnel

Current technical staff

Management

Records and statistics

Season by season

Managers and statistics 

Only competitive matches are taken into account.

Notable players

The following Sreenidi Deccan players have been capped at full international level''. Years in brackets indicate their spells at the club.

  Mohamed Awal (2021–)
  Faysal Shayesteh (2022–)
  Dua Stanislas Ankira (2023–)

Honours
League
I-League
Runners-up (1): 2022–23
Third place (1): 2021–22

Cup
IFA Shield
Runners-up (1): 2021

Other department

Sreenidi Deccan youth
Sreenidi Deccan have their youth men's football section that participates in various nationwide tournaments. Club's leading football academy is based in Hyderabad. Their U17 team took part in the inaugural 2022–23 U-17 Youth Cup in January 2023. Reserve team of the club also took part in prestigious Stafford Challenge Cup in Bangalore. Club's U21 team participated in the "south zone" qualifiers of 2023 Reliance Foundation Development League.

Honours
 TFA C-Division Championship
Champions (1): 2022
Apollo Tyres Hotfut Youth League (U-14)
Champions (1): 2022

See also
List of football clubs in India

Notes

References

External links

 Club profile at AIFF (the-aiff.com)
Sreenidi Deccan FC at Sofascore
Sreenidi Deccan FC at Flashscore
Team info at Global Sports Archive
Sreenidi Deccan FC at WorldFootball.net

Sreenidi Deccan FC
Association football clubs established in 2015
Football clubs in Hyderabad
I-League clubs
2015 establishments in Telangana